Durand Union Station is a historic train station in Durand, Michigan. The station, which now serves Amtrak Blue Water trains, was originally a busy Grand Trunk Western Railroad and Ann Arbor Railroad hub, as well as a local office for Grand Trunk Western, from its construction in 1903 until 1974. It is currently owned by the city of Durand and leased by Durand Union Station, Inc. a nonprofit organization dedicated to the preservation, restoration, and maintenance of the building and its surrounding property.

The building also houses three small railroad history museums: the Michigan Railroad History Museum (which doubles as a gift shop), the Grand Trunk Western Railroad Museum, and the Ann Arbor Railroad History Museum. Also in the building is a model railroad club, the Durand Union Station Model Railroad Engineers and its large layout, and a ballroom for special events and parties.

The station sits at the junction of Canadian National Railway's busy mainline interchange of the Flint and Holly Subdivisions.  Additionally, Great Lakes Central Railroad and Huron and Eastern Railway operate near the station, and a freight yard used by all three carriers is located just north of it. It is one of Michigan's most popular locations for railfans to visit, especially during the annual Durand Railroad Days Festival in May. The station was added to the National Register of Historic Places on June 6, 1971, and the Michigan Register of Historic Places in 1987.

The station's lessees are currently attempting to raise $50,000 for building repairs.

History
The station is an important part of railway history in the state. Built in 1903 by the Detroit firm of Spier and Rohns it had a high volume of rail traffic as the Grand Trunk Western and Ann Arbor railroads crossed at that location. It was almost destroyed by fire in 1905, but quickly rebuilt. At its peak, 42 passenger, 22 mail, and 78 freight trains passed through Durand on a daily basis. It serviced almost 3,000 passengers a day.

Final years of peak passenger service
In July, 1950, the station lost northwest–southeast service with the Ann Arbor Railroad's terminating passenger service, which went from Toledo to Frankfort and Elberta on Lake Michigan. (Elberta was a launch point for ferries north and west across Lake Michigan.)

Into the 1960s the Grand Trunk Western (operating in Canada under the Canadian National Railway) three trains a day operated as part of Chicago - Port Huron - London - Toronto trains: Inter-City Limited, International Limited (only making stops on the eastbound trip), La Salle and Maple Leaf. Until 1960 the Grand Trunk also into ran through trains from Detroit to Grand Rapids and Muskegon, where ferries could be boarded, for travelling across Lake Michigan, to Milwaukee. From Durand passengers could also board Detroit - Bay City mixed trains.

Decline
In 1971, the Grand Trunk Western terminated its last trains through Durand. These included the International Limited, its Chicago-Detroit Mohawk and an unnamed duplicate itinerary train with that route. In 1974, the GTW decided to close the station due to declining traffic. The historic building was going to be torn down, however, the city of Durand filed for an injunction to stop the demolition and eventually purchased the station in 1979 for $1.00.

Amtrak restored service through the station in 1974 and today Amtrak continues to provide daily intercity passenger rail service on the Blue Water route between Chicago and Port Huron, a remnant of the Grand Trunk service. Baggage cannot be checked at this location; however, up to two suitcases in addition to any "personal items" such as briefcases, purses, laptop bags, and infant equipment are allowed on board as carry-ons.  From 1982 to 2004, it was instead served by the modern incarnation of the International Limited, operated jointly by Via Rail and Amtrak between Chicago and Toronto.

See also
History of railroads in Michigan

References

External links

 Durand Union Station, Inc Official Site
Michigan Railroad History Museum Official Site
Durand Union Station Model Railroad Engineers Official Site
Durand Union Station / Michigan Railroad History Museum on Facebook
 Durand Depot (Michigan Passenger Stations)
 Durand Amtrak Station & Michigan Railroad History Museum (USA Rail Guide -- Train Web)

Amtrak stations in Michigan
Durand
Railroad museums in Michigan
Museums in Shiawassee County, Michigan
Railway stations on the National Register of Historic Places in Michigan
Former Grand Trunk Western Railroad stations
Spier & Rohns buildings
Railway stations in the United States opened in 1903
National Register of Historic Places in Shiawassee County, Michigan
1903 establishments in Michigan